Ernstia minoricensis is a species of calcareous sponge in the family Clathrinidae found in Spain. The species is named after the island of Menorca where the type specimen was discovered.

Description
Triactines and tetractines are regular (equiangular and equiradiate) and are the same size. The actines are 7-10 times longer than they are thick, with slender tapers. The apical actines of the tetractines are straight and 3-4 times thinner than the triacines.

References
World Register of Marine Species entry

Clathrina
Sponges described in 1896
Fauna of Spain